Antumi Pallas (born 13 November 1969), also known as Antumi Toasijé, is a Spanish-Colombian historian and Pan-African activist of African descent (Afro-Spaniard). A Global History lecturer at the University of New York in Madrid as well as professor in other Universities in Spain, he is a specialist in African History and culture, racism, and Pan-African political philosophy.

Biography
Antumi Toasijé was born on 13 November 1969 in Bogotá to Laura Victoria Valencia Rentería, an Afro-Colombian woman from Quibdó whose African roots are in the Temne people from Sierra Leone, and an exiled Spanish father. He is closely affiliated with Equatorial Guinea, but lives and works primarily in Spain where he moved at the age of two. Toasijé identifies spiritually as a Buddhist.

Antumi Toasijé earned his PhD from the University of Alcala in Spain in History, culture and thought, with a Thesis on the black presence in Spain from the Iron Age to present times  Previously he studied at the University of the Balearic Islands and obtained the title of Licentiate in history before starting his doctorate degree from the Autonomous University of Madrid. Currently he is the Director of the Center for Pan-African Studies, President of the Pan-African Center, has been Director of the Journal of Migrations of the Federation of Balearic Immigrant Associations, and has been a member of the Group of African Studies at the Autonomous University of Madrid.

Toasijé lived his early years in Ibiza in the Balearic Islands where he took up painting and poetry. He was a member of the poetic group Desfauste and participated actively in the cultural life of the island. In 2003, together with a group of African intellectuals, he founded the Association of African and Pan-African Studies, whose journal Nsibidi was the first Spanish-language journal of African social studies. In 2005 he directed the scientific committee of the 2nd Pan-African Congress in Spain under the auspices of the National University of Distance Education. Later he became involved with the Hispanic slavery reparations movement, culminating on 17 February 2009 with the passage of a non-binding motion on the matter by the Congress of Deputies. Toasijé is a recognized figure of afrocentricity and Pan Africanism in the Spanish Speaking world. Currently, he is part of the civil society working team of facilitators of the African Union 6th Region in charge of Spain and the Spanish Speaking Countries. Also Antumi Toasijé is the prime impetus behind the New Universal Calendar (NUCAL) movement.

Toasijé has been lecturing and conferencing in various Spanish Universities and institutions, he is the coauthor of various books about immigration and African themes, and has written extensively both in the academic and the popular press. He works closely with other Spanish-speaking Pan-Africanists such as Mbuyi Kabunda Badi and Justo Bolekia Boleká.

Books 
 Si me preguntáis por el Panafricanismo y la Afrocentricidad (2013)
 La noche inabarcable Novel (2019)
 Africanidad (2020)

Academic papers
 Mujer africano norteamericana decimonónica: imagen, discurso y actitudes liberadoras. (2006)
 The Africanity of Spain Identity and Problematization. (2007)
 La esclavitud en el XVI en territorios hispánicos. (2008 Published in 2010)
 Autoafirmación y naturalidad en las literaturas africanas clásicas de resistencia de la mano de Edward Said. (2008)
 Desarrollismos Despistes y Auto-Realización Africana. En torno a Amartya Sen y M. Molineux. (2010)
 La memoria y el reconocimiento de la comunidad africana y africano-descendiente negra en España: El papel de la vanguardia panafricanista. (2010)
 El cine de África negra: la mirada moral.(2010)

See also
Afro-Colombians
Afro-Spaniards
Pan-Africanism

References

External links
 Si me preguntáis por el panafricanismo y la afrocentricidad 2013, Antumi Toasijé's book
 Antumi Toasijé's Website
 Interview with Antumi Toasijé in the Spanish National Radio about famine in Somalia
 La memoria y el reconocimiento de la comunidad africana y africano-descendiente negra en España: El papel de la vanguardia panafricanista. Academic Paper
 Articles in the "Publico" Newspaper
 Interview to Antumi Toasijé (Audio)
 Interview to Professor Antumi Toasijé: "El componente europeo está presente en todos y cada uno de los conflictos mayores que se han dado en África"
 News about African migration in Spain, The Guardian Newspaper of South-Africa
 Intervention in a round table in Madrid

1969 births
Living people
People from Bogotá
Colombian emigrants to Spain
Colombian people of Spanish descent
People of Temne descent
Spanish activists
Spanish pan-Africanists
Colombian pan-Africanists
University of the Balearic Islands alumni
21st-century Spanish historians
Colombian Buddhists
Spanish Buddhists
Colombian people of African descent